Rebecca Rhynhart (born September 29, 1974) is an American politician from Pennsylvania. A member of the Democratic Party, she serves as the City Controller of Philadelphia. Prior to running for City Controller, Rhynhart worked in Philadelphia city government and in the private sector.  

Rhynhart is a candidate for the 2023 Philadelphia mayoral election. She was a managing director at Bear Stearns on the credit derivatives desk during the housing collapse of 2008. Prior to Bear, she worked on municipal debt at Fitch Rating Agency.

Education

Rhynhart grew up in Abington, Pennsylvania. She has a Bachelor of Arts from Middlebury College and received a graduate degree in Public Administration from Columbia University.

Political career

Prior involvement in Philadelphia government

In 2008, Rhynhart became Philadelphia’s City Treasurer as part of Mayor Michael Nutter’s administration. She subsequently became Budget Director, playing a pivotal role in the city’s economic recovery from The Great Recession.

Rhynhart also served as the Chief Administrative Officer in Mayor Jim Kenney’s administration.

Philadelphia City Controller

Rhynhart is the first woman ever elected to the office of controller in the city of Philadelphia. She won a primary challenge by 17 percentage points against three-time democratic incumbent Alan Butkovitz in the Spring of 2017. This was considered a significant upset victory as it was an off-year election and Butkovitz was backed by the Democratic Party.
Rhynhart went on to defeat Republican Mike Tomlinson in the November general election of that same year where she won over 80% of the vote.

On October 18, 2022, Rhynart's office released a review of Philadelphia Police Department spending and performance. The report detailed disparities in 911 response times, crime fighting strategy, staffing issues, community relations, and data collection and usage. It was widely perceived as critical of the police department. One week later, on October 25, 2022, Rhynhart resigned from her position as controller to run for mayor. She told The Philadelphia Inquirer that she waited to start her campaign until after the release of the report.

References

Living people
Politicians from Philadelphia
Pennsylvania Democrats
Women in Pennsylvania politics
Middlebury College alumni
1974 births